Bailey Hall may refer to:

Bailey Hall, Hertford, Hertfordshire, England
Bailey Hall (University of Kansas), listed on the National Register of Historic Places (NRHP)
Bailey Hall (University of Minnesota)
Bailey Hall (Ithaca, New York), a building on the campus of Cornell University, NRHP-listed
Bailey Hall (Delta State University)
Bailey Hall (Urbana College), Urbana, Ohio

Architectural disambiguation pages